The Norfolk Southern Railway  is a Class I freight railroad operating in the Eastern United States. Headquartered in Atlanta, the company was formed in 1982 with the merger of the Norfolk and Western Railway and Southern Railway. The company operates 19,420 route miles (31,250 kilometers) in 22 eastern states, the District of Columbia, and had rights in Canada over the Albany to Montréal route of the Canadian Pacific Railway. Norfolk Southern Railway is the leading subsidiary of the Norfolk Southern Corporation.

Norfolk Southern is responsible for maintaining , with the remainder being operated under trackage rights from other parties responsible for maintenance. Intermodal containers and trailers are the most common commodity type carried by NS, which have grown as the coal business has declined throughout the 21st century; coal was formerly the largest traffic source. The railway offers the largest intermodal rail network in eastern North America. NS was also the pioneer of Roadrailer service. Norfolk Southern and its chief competitor, CSX Transportation, have a duopoly on the transcontinental freight rail lines in the Eastern United States.

Norfolk Southern is the namesake and leading subsidiary of the Norfolk Southern Corporation, based in Atlanta, Georgia; it was headquartered in Norfolk, Virginia until 2021. Norfolk Southern Corporation was incorporated in Virginia on July 23, 1980, and is publicly traded on the New York Stock Exchange (NYSE) under the symbol NSC. The primary business function of Norfolk Southern Corporation is the rail transportation of raw materials, intermediate products, and finished goods across the Southeast, East, and Midwest United States. The corporation further facilitates transport to the remainder of the United States through interchange with other rail carriers while also serving overseas transport needs by serving several Atlantic and Gulf Coast ports. As of April 10, 2019, Norfolk Southern Corporation's total public stock value was slightly over $51.6 billion.

History

Corporate history

Predecessors 
Norfolk Southern's predecessor railroads date to the early 19th century.

The SOU's earliest predecessor line was the South Carolina Canal & Rail Road. Chartered in 1827, the South Carolina Canal & Rail Road Company became the first to offer regularly scheduled passenger train service with the inaugural run of the Best Friend of Charleston in 1830. Another early predecessor, the Richmond & Danville Railroad (R&D), was formed in 1847 and expanded into a large system after the American Civil War under Algernon S. Buford. The R&D ultimately fell on hard times, and in 1894, it became a major portion of the new Southern Railway (SOU). Financier J. P. Morgan selected veteran railroader Samuel Spencer as president. Profitable and innovative, Southern became, in 1953, the first major U.S. railroad to completely switch to diesel-electric locomotives from steam.

The City Point Railroad, established in 1838, was a  railroad in Virginia that started south of Richmond — specifically, City Point on the navigable portion of the James River, now part of the independent city of Hopewell — and ran to Petersburg. It was acquired by the South Side Railroad in 1854. After the Civil War, it became part of the Atlantic, Mississippi & Ohio Railroad (AM&O), a trunk line across Virginia's southern tier formed by mergers in 1870 by William Mahone, who had built the Norfolk & Petersburg Railroad in the 1850s. The AM&O was the oldest portion of the Norfolk & Western (N&W) when it was formed in 1881, under new owners with a keen interest and financial investments in the coal fields of Western Virginia and West Virginia, a product which came to define and enrich the railroad. In the second half of the 20th century, the N&W acquired the Virginian Railway (1959), the Wabash Railway, and the Nickel Plate Road, among others.

Formation 
In 1980, the Norfolk Southern Corporation was created as a holding company for the Southern Railway (SOU, formed in 1894) and Norfolk & Western Railway (N&W, formed in 1881). In 1982, the Southern Railroad was given the new name of the Norfolk Southern Railway, an older line acquired by SOU in 1974 that primarily served North Carolina and the southeastern tip of Virginia; following this, Norfolk and Western was merged into the company, forming one, united, railroad. Headquarters for the new NS were established in Norfolk, Virginia. The company suffered a slight embarrassment when the marble headpiece at the building's entrance was unveiled, which read "Norfork Southern Railway". A new headpiece replaced the erroneous one several weeks later. NS aimed to compete in the eastern United States with CSX Transportation, formed after the Interstate Commerce Commission's 1980 approval of the merger of the Chessie System and the Seaboard System.

Conrail purchase 
The system grew with the acquisition of over half of Conrail. The Consolidated Rail Corporation (Conrail) was an  system formed in 1976 from the Penn Central Railroad (1968–1976), and five other ailing northeastern railroads that were conveyed into it, forming a government-financed corporation. Conrail was perhaps the most controversial conglomerate in corporate history. Penn Central itself was created by merging three venerable rivals — the Pennsylvania Railroad (PRR, 1846), the New York Central Railroad (NYC, 1831), and the New York, New Haven & Hartford Railroad (NYNH&H, 1872) — as well as some smaller competitors. In 1980, Conrail became profitable after the Staggers Act largely deregulated the U.S. railroad industry. In 1996, CSX bid to buy Conrail; Norfolk Southern, fearing that CSX would come to dominate rail traffic in the eastern U.S., responded with a bid of its own. On June 23, 1997, NS and CSX filed a joint application with the Surface Transportation Board (STB) for authority to purchase, divide, and operate the assets of Conrail. On June 6, 1998, the STB approved the NS-CSX application, effective August 22, 1998. CSX got the remaining 42%. NS began operating its trains on its portion of the former Conrail network on June 1, 1999, closing out the 1990s merger era.

21st century 
In 2016, a proposed merger that had been months in the pipeline with Canadian Pacific was abandoned abruptly. The proposed merger would have seen the joining of two companies worth over $20 billion each.

According to NS's 2018 Annual Report to Investors, at the end of 2018, NS had more than 26,000 employees, 4,100 locomotives, and 54,400 freight cars. At the end of 2018, the transport of coal made up 16% of the total operating revenue of NS, general merchandise (automotive, chemicals, metals, construction materials, agriculture commodities, consumer products, paper, clay, and forest products) made up 59%, and intermodal made up 25% of the total. Norfolk Southern has since slimmed its fleet to roughly 3,950 locomotives.

On December 12, 2018, Norfolk Southern announced that it would be relocating its headquarters to Atlanta, Georgia, leaving its hometown of Norfolk after 38 years. The new headquarters building opened on November 10, 2021.

Environmental history 

In early spring of 2008, the state program manager for air quality planning in Georgia, Jimmy Johnston, had been talking to NS about voluntary upgrades to reduce the company's environmental impact. NS is upgrading 3,800 of its locomotives with new technology that is 73 percent more efficient than previous models. The new technology being put into the locomotives is making the ride more fuel efficient and reducing idle time.

In 2009, the company introduced an experimental battery-electric switcher locomotive, NS 999. This prototype locomotive was developed by Norfolk Southern in collaboration with the United States Department of Energy, the Federal Railroad Administration and the Pennsylvania State University.

Labor history 
In 2019, Norfolk Southern made a plan to lay off over 3,500 workers as a result of precision railroading. Since 2019, a labor dispute between Norfolk Southern Railways and railway workers has been underway. In September 2022, the workers and companies involved tentatively agreed to a deal, but it was rejected by a majority of the union's members. In late 2022, the United States Congress intervened to prevent a strike by passing the tentative deal into law.

Notable accidents
On September 15, 2002, a Norfolk Southern train derailed in Farragut, Tennessee. The derailment resulted in the release of oleum or fuming sulfuric acid. Roughly 2,600 residents were evacuated from nearby homes for three days until hazardous materials crews were able to mitigate the scene. No fatalities or major injuries were reported as a result of the derailment, but property damage and losses were calculated at $1.02 million. Seventeen people were injured.

On January 6, 2005, a NS derailment resulted in a large amount of chlorine and diesel fuel being released into nearby waterways in Graniteville, South Carolina. In addition, a toxic cloud covered the city resulting in the town being evacuated. Local wildlife was killed, many of the local crops and vegetation were contaminated or killed, nine human deaths were reported, and thousands were injured. The company was taken to court and fined for violating the Clean Water Act and the Federal Superfund law. NS spent a total of $26 million for the cleanup.

2023 Ohio derailment

On February 3, 2023, a freight train carrying vinyl chloride, butyl acrylate,  ethylhexyl acrylate and ethylene glycol monobutyl ether derailed along the Norfolk Southern Railway in East Palestine, Ohio, United States. Emergency crews conducted a controlled burn of the spill which released hydrogen chloride and phosgene into the air. On February 8, affected businesses and residents filed three class action lawsuits against the company. 

Norfolk Southern, along with other rail companies, had successfully lobbied for the repeal of rules requiring electronically controlled pneumatic brakes on trains carrying hazardous materials, which could have reduced the severity of the incident.

Norfolk Southern Railway offered $1,000 payments to locals in order to "cover costs related to the evacuation". Some residents expressed concerns that taking these payouts would limit their ability to join future legal actions.

In the aftermath of the disaster, the company was accused of prioritizing  $10 billion in stock buybacks for shareholders over maintenance. MarketWatch reported that in the three weeks following the incident the company's stock has lost about $6.68 billion in market capitalization in a 11.6% drop in stock value.

One February 25, 2023, the Environmental Protection Agency (EPA) ordered Norfolk Southern to stop shipments of hazardous waste out of East Palestine, Ohio. This announcement followed days after the EPA took over cleanup efforts in the area. The EPA director, Debra Shore, emphasized that the stoppage of shipments was temporary and would resume "very soon".

Company officers

 John P. Fishwick, Sr.
 CEO and President of Norfolk Western Railroad: 1970–1980
 CEO and President of Norfolk Southern Railroad: 1980–1981
 Robert B. Claytor
 CEO: 1982 – 1987
 Arnold B. McKinnon
 CEO and President: 1987 – 1992
 David R. Goode:
CEO: 1992 – 2005
President: 1991 – 2004
 Charles "Wick" Moorman:
CEO: 2005 – 2015
President: 2004 – 2013
 James A. Squires:
President: June 1, 2013 – December 2021
CEO:  June 1, 2015 – May 1, 2022
Alan H. Shaw
President: December 2021 – Present
CEO:  May 1, 2022 – Present

Current trackage

Regional divisions
Norfolk Southern is divided into three operation regions, each containing two divisions. 

 Southern Region
 Gulf Division
 Coastal Division
 Central Region
 Midwest Division
 Blue Ridge Division
 Northern Region
 Great Lakes Division
 Keystone Division

Premier Corridor

The Premier Corridor is Norfolk Southern's principal east–west line from the East Coast to the Midwest. An average day sees 40–60 trains of all types. The corridor's main (New York to Chicago) segment consists of the Lehigh Line, Reading Line, Harrisburg Line, Pittsburgh Line, Fort Wayne Line, Cleveland Line, and Chicago Line.

Chicago Bypass

Meridian Speedway

Pan Am Southern/Patriot Corridor
On May 15, 2008, NS announced that it would join with Pan Am Railways to create the "Patriot Corridor", an improved rail route between Albany, New York, and the greater Boston, Massachusetts, area. On March 12, 2009, STB approved the deal. Each of the two companies now owns 50% of a new company known as Pan Am Southern (PAS). PAR's trackage between Ayer, Massachusetts, and Mechanicville, New York, was transferred to PAS and continues to be operated and maintained by PAR's Springfield Terminal Railway Company subsidiary. NS transferred to PAS cash and property valued at $140 million. The railroad operates 22K and 23K from Mechanicville, NY to Ayer, MA. Due to the unique ACSES PTC system used on Keolis-operated trackage, which the 22K and 23K runs on between Wachusett and Ayer, only specific SD60E locomotives equipped with ACSES can lead trains. 

In 2021, CSX announced its intention to purchase Pan Am Railways. Norfolk Southern protested, arguing that CSX, which would own 50% of Pan Am Southern, would be able to block Norfolk Southern out of the northeast. As part of the Surface Transportation Board merger requirements, CSX will give NS limited trackage rights to run intermodal trains, and Pan Am Southern will be operated by the Pittsburg and Shawmut Railroad, under the name Berkshire and Eastern Railroad.

Yards and facilities

Largely an eastern U.S. railway, NS directly owns and operates  of track in 22 states. It operates four primary hubs in its system: Harrisburg, Pennsylvania, Chicago, and Atlanta, and maintains facilities across the Eastern US to facilitate operations, including rail classification yards, intermodal yards, and locomotive shops

NS has rights to operate its trains with its own crews on competing railroads' tracks. These trackage rights permit NS to operate as far west as Dallas, Texas, on BNSF Railway tracks, as far north as Waterville, Maine, and as far south as Miami, Florida, on the Florida East Coast Railway tracks. NS locomotives also occasionally operate on competitors' tracks throughout the U.S. and Canada due to the practice of locomotive leasing and sharing undertaken by the Class I railroads. Not including second, third, and fourth main line trackage, yards, and sidings, NS directly operates  of track.

General freight classification yards

Intermodal classification yards

Locomotive shops

NS also shares interest with CSX in the Oak Island Yard, managed by Conrail Shared Assets Operations in Newark, New Jersey.

Steam excursion programs

After the 1982 merger, NS President Robert Claytor retained the Southern Railway's steam excursion program begun in the 1960s by his brother, SOU president W. Graham Claytor. NS initially used former Chesapeake and Ohio 2716, which had been modified and decorated as a Southern locomotive for the steam program; however, the engine developed mechanical problems in her fire box after less than a year in excursion service and was replaced by Nickel Plate 765.

Merging with the Norfolk & Western Railway prompted the steam program to acquire and overhaul Norfolk & Western 611 in 1982, and Norfolk & Western 1218 in 1987. These two locomotives and 765 joined the steam program veterans – Southern Railway 4501, Savannah and Atlanta Railway 750, Nickel Plate 587, Louisville & Nashville 152, Atlanta and West Point 290, Tennessee Valley Railroad 610, and Frisco 1522 – for an extensive series of excursions throughout the late 1980s and early 1990s.

Norfolk Southern's management under David R. Goode was forced to end the program in late 1994, citing safety concerns, rising insurance costs, the expense of maintaining the steam locomotives and decreasing rail network availability due to a surge in freight traffic. On December 3, 1994, the 611 became the last steam locomotive running on Norfolk Southern's trackage, running her last steam-powered excursion round-trip between Birmingham, Alabama, and Chattanooga, Tennessee. After that, the 611 went on a three-day ferry move from Birmingham to Roanoke, Virginia. She stopped at Atlanta, Georgia, for the night on December 5 and next to Salisbury, NC the next day on December 6. Finally, the 611 departed Salisbury and continued her final trip. When the locomotive arrived back in Roanoke, 611 had its fire put out for the last time.

In June 2010, Norfolk Southern CEO Wick Moorman announced that NS would run excursions with Southern Railway 4501, Southern Railway 630, and U.S. Army 610 with their new 21st Century Steam program.

The program began in 2011 with excursions in the south powered by 630 and in the north by 765. On February 22, 2013, the Virginia Museum of Transportation (611's owner) formed a campaign called "Fire Up 611!" to conduct a feasibility study with the goal of returning the 611 to active service and have it join the program. The locomotive was removed from her static display from the Virginia Museum of Transportation to the North Carolina Transportation Museum in 2014 to be overhauled. That same year, TVRM completed their restoration of Southern Railway 4501 – joining the 21st Century Steam program for the 2015 season and pulling excursions in Tennessee, Virginia, and Georgia. The restoration of 611 was completed in May 2015 and celebrated with a run to Roanoke, Virginia, where it was originally built. The 611 pulled several excursions in Virginia and was featured in special events at the North Carolina Transportation Museum. In December 2015, Norfolk Southern had concluded their program; however, the 611 continued to run various excursions, hosted by the Virginia Museum of Transportation and the North Carolina Transportation Museum instead of Norfolk Southern across the NS system in Virginia and North Carolina.

Rolling stock

Reporting marks

Although it has been widely known as simply "Norfolk Southern" since 1982, the corporate structure and reporting marks are more complicated. In 1999, when most of Conrail's former PRR trackage was sold to the Norfolk Southern Railway, the Pennsylvania Railway Lines was created and PRR reporting marks used on the former Conrail motive power and rolling stock.

See also

History of railroads in Michigan
Southern Railway's Spencer Shops (now a museum in Salisbury, North Carolina)
List of Norfolk Southern predecessor railroads
Thoroughbred Shortline Program

Improvement projects
Crescent Corridor - Louisiana to New Jersey
Heartland Corridor - Midwest to Norfolk

References

Bibliography

Further reading

External links

 
 Norfolk Southern system map 

 
Companies based in Norfolk, Virginia
Rail in Greater St. Louis
Virginia railroads
West Virginia railroads
Alabama railroads
Delaware railroads
Washington, D.C., railroads
Florida railroads
Georgia (U.S. state) railroads
Indiana railroads
Iowa railroads
Kansas railroads
Kentucky railroads
Louisiana railroads
Maryland railroads
Massachusetts railroads
Michigan railroads
Mississippi railroads
Missouri railroads
New Jersey railroads
New York (state) railroads
North Carolina railroads
Ohio railroads
Ontario railways
Pennsylvania railroads
South Carolina railroads
Tennessee railroads
Vermont railroads
Railroads in the Chicago metropolitan area
Companies in the Dow Jones Transportation Average
Economy of the Eastern United States
Class I railroads in North America
Railway companies established in 1982
Illinois railroads